Philippe Blay (born in April 1960) is a French musicologist.

Publications 
 (Dir.) Musée de la Musique : guide, Paris: musée de la Musique (Cité de la musique), Éditions de la Réunion des musées nationaux, impr. 1997, 271 p.
 (Dir. with Raphaëlle Legrand) Sillages musicologiques: hommages à Yves Gérard, Paris : C.N.S.M.D.P., 1997, 337 pages.
 L'Île du rêve de Reynaldo Hahn : contribution à l'étude de l'opéra français de l'époque fin-de-siècle, Villeneuve d’Ascq : Presses universitaires du Septentrion, 2000, 3 vol., coll. Thèse à la carte.
 « Grand Siècle et Belle Époque : La Carmélite de Reynaldo Hahn », in Aspects de l’opéra français de Meyerbeer à Honegger, coordinated by Jean-Christophe Branger and Vincent Giroud, Lyon: Symétrie, Palazzeto Bru Zane, cop. 2009, series Perpetuum mobile.
 (Dir.) Reynaldo Hahn, un éclectique en musique, Arles: Actes Sud, Palazzetto Bru Zane, 2015, 504 p. Actes du colloque « Reynaldo Hahn : un éclectique en musique », Venise, Palazzetto Bru Zane – Centre de musique romantique française, 11-12 May 2011. Prix du temps retrouvé (Prix des Muses 2016).
 (In collab. with Jean-Christophe Branger and Luc Fraisse) Marcel Proust et Reynaldo Hahn: une œuvre à quatre mains, avant-propos d’Eva de Vengohechea, Paris: Classiques Garnier, 2018, coll. Bibliothèque proustienne, no 21.

References

External links 
 Philippe Blay on CNRS
 Philippe Blay on Academia

1960 births
Living people
Côte d'Azur University alumni
University of Tours alumni
University of Provence alumni
Conservatoire de Paris alumni
20th-century French musicologists
21st-century French musicologists